is a Japanese tarento and model.

Filmography

Television

Radio

References

External links
 
 
 
 

Japanese television personalities
Japanese female models
Japanese radio personalities
Models from Kanagawa Prefecture
1985 births
Living people
21st-century Japanese singers
21st-century Japanese women singers